Wulfenite is a lead molybdate mineral with the formula PbMoO4. It can be most often found as thin tabular crystals with a bright orange-red to yellow-orange color, sometimes brown, although the color can be highly variable. In its yellow form it is sometimes called "yellow lead ore".

It crystallizes in the tetragonal system, often occurring as stubby, pyramidal or tabular crystals. It also occurs as earthy, granular masses. It is found in many localities, associated with lead ores as a secondary mineral associated with the oxidized zone of lead deposits.  It is also a secondary ore of molybdenum, and is sought by collectors.

Discovery and occurrence

Wulfenite was first described in 1845 for an occurrence in Bad Bleiberg, Carinthia, Austria. It was named for Franz Xavier von Wulfen (1728–1805), an Austrian mineralogist.

It occurs as a secondary mineral in oxidized hydrothermal lead deposits. It occurs with cerussite, anglesite, smithsonite, hemimorphite, vanadinite, pyromorphite, mimetite, descloizite, plattnerite and various iron and manganese oxides.

A noted locality for wulfenite is the Red Cloud Mine in Arizona. Crystals are deep red in color and usually very well-formed. Wulfenite was approved as the official state mineral of Arizona in 2017. The Los Lamentos locality in Mexico produced very thick tabular orange crystals.

Another locality is Mount Peca in Slovenia. The crystals are yellow, often with well-developed pyramids and bipyramids. In 1997, the crystal was depicted on a stamp by the Post of Slovenia.

Lesser known localities of wulfenite include: Sherman Tunnel, St. Peter's Dome, Tincup-Tomichi-Moncarch mining districts, Pride of America mine and Bandora mine in Colorado.

Small crystals also occur in Bulwell and Kirkby-in-Ashfield, England. These crystals occur in a galena-wulfenite-uraniferous asphaltite horizon in a magnesian limestone. The wulfenite found in this area is similar in properties (paragenetic sequence, low silver and antimony contents of the galenas and absence of pyromorphite) to the wulfenites of the Alps and may be similar in origin.

Crystallography
Wulfenite crystallizes in the tetragonal system and possesses nearly equal axial ratios; as a result, it is considered to be crystallographically similar to scheelite(CaWO4). Wulfenite is classed by a pyramidal-hemihedral (tetragonal dipyramidal) (C4h) crystal symmetry. Therefore, the unit cell is formed by placing points at the vertices and centers of the faces of rhomboids with square bases and the crystallographic axes coincide in directions with the edges of the rhomboids. Two of these lattices interpenetrate such that a point on the first is diagonal to the second and one quarter the distance between the two seconds.

An extensive solid solution exists between the two end members wulfenite and stolzite (PbWO4), such that tungstenian-wulfenite compositions range from 90% wulfenite and 10% stolzite to chillagite (64% wulfenite, 36% stolzite) and so on. Nevertheless, the Commission for New Minerals and Mineral Names of the International Mineralogical Association has deemed that the solid solutions do not require new names. The correct nomenclature of the 90:10 solid state is wulfenite-I41/a and the 64:36 solid state is wulfenite-I4.  The structure of the wulfenite-I41/a system can be described as a close packing of tetrahedral MoO42− anions and Pb2+ cations.  In the lattice, the MoO42− anions are slightly distorted, though the bond lengths remain equal and the oxygens are linked through Pb-O bonds. Each lead atom has an 8-coordination with oxygen and two slightly different Pb-O bond distances. This structure closely resembles that of pure wulfenite.

The structure of wulfenite-I4 is also very similar to that of wulfenite-I41/a but has an unequal distribution of tungsten and molybdenum which may explain the observed hemihedrism.

It is argued that no miscibility gap exists in the wulfenite-stolzite solid solution at room temperature due to the almost identical size and shape of the MoO42− and WO42− ions, however, arguments have been made for the existence of a miscibility gap at higher temperatures.

Hemihedrism
The crystals of wulfenite are usually more tabular and thinner than those of scheelite, however, the more pyramidal and prismatic crystals show distinct hemimorphism.

Thermodynamics and reactivity
The heat capacity, entropy and enthalpy of wulfenite were determined taking into consideration the existence of solid solutions and the inclusion of impurities. The reported values are as follows: Cp°(298.15) = 119.41±0.13 J/molK, S°(298.15) = (168.33±2.06)J/molK, ΔH°= (23095±50) J/mol.

When forced through a tube into a flame, wulfenite disintegrates audibly and fuses readily. With the salt of phosphorus, it yields molybdenum beads. With soda on charcoal it yields a lead globule. When the powdered mineral is evaporated with HCl, molybdic oxide is formed.

Molybdenum can be extracted from wulfenite by crushing the ore to 60-80 mesh, mixing the ore with NaNO3 or NaOH, heating the mixture to about 700 °C (decomposing), leaching with water, filtering, collecting the insoluble residues which may include Fe, Al, Zn, Cu, Mn, Pb, Au and Ag, then the NaMoO4 solution is agitated with a solution of MgCl2, filtered, CaCl2 or FeCl2 or any other chlorides is added to the Mo solution and heated and agitated, filtered and the desired product is collected. The full process is patented by the Union Carbide and Carbon Corp.

Synthesis 
Wulfenite has been shown to form synthetically through the sintering of molybdite with cerussite as well as that of molybdite with lead oxide. The following will describe both methods of synthesis.

Synthesis from molybdite and cerussite:

Thermal analysis of the 1:1 mix of molybdite and cerussite first displayed the characteristic peaks of cerussite. There is a sharp endothermic peak at 300 °C, which occurs during the dehydration of hydrocerussite associated with cerussite. A second peak at 350 °C is the first step of cerussite’s dissociation into PbO*PbCO3. Later at 400 °C, a medium endothermic peak represents the second step of the dissociation into lead oxide. These transitions involve a decrease in mass, which occurs in steps. First, the dehydration of hydrocerussite is marked by its loss of constitutional OH and later is the freeing of carbon dioxide during the cerussite dissociation. The formation of wulfenite occurs at 520 °C, as observed in the exothermic peak. The reaction between lead oxides and molybdenum takes place at 500-600 °C, along with the formation of lead molybdate.

The endothermic peaks at 880 and 995 °C perhaps denote the vaporization and melting of unreacted lead and molybdenum oxides. A small peak at 1050 °C represents the melting of the wulfenite product itself, while an even smaller peak at 680 °C may indicate some vaporization of molybdite as the molybdenum oxide volatilizes at 600-650 °C.

This reaction occurs as follows:

350 °C: 2PbCO3 → PbO*PbCO3+CO2

400 °C: PbO*PbCO3 → 2PbO+CO2

500-520 °C: MoO 3+PbO → PbMoO4 (wulfenite)

Synthesis from molybdite and lead oxide:

Thermal analysis for molybdite and lead oxide mixes at a 1:1 ratio suggest that the formation of wulfenite occurs at 500 °C, as can be seen by an exothermic peak at this temperature. Microscopic investigation of the products show that at 500 °C, wulfenite is the main product, while at 950 °C, wulfenite is the only constituent of the product, as grains of molybdite and lead oxide melt and undergo volatilization. A small endothermic peak at 640 °C may represent the start of vaporization, and a sharp and large endothermic peak at 980 °C indicates the melting and volatilization of the unreacted lead and molybdenum oxides.

Characteristics of synthetic wulfenite:

Synthetically-made wulfenite will have the following composition: 61.38% PbO and 38.6% MoO3. This synthesis will give you samples of wulfenite that is pale-yellow in thin sections and is optically negative. It crystallizes in the tetragonal system, in the form of square tabular crystals, and with distinct cleavage on {011}. It crystals also display transparency and adamantine luster. The X-ray diffraction data, calculated cell dimensions, constants and optic axial angles of the synthetic wulfenite are consistent with those of the natural mineral.

Coloration
Pure wulfenite is colorless, but most all samples display colors ranging from a creamy yellow to a sharp, intense red. Some samples even display blues, browns, and blacks. The yellow and red coloration of wulfenites is caused by small traces of chromium. Others have suggested that while the lead adds little colors, perhaps the molybdate contributes to wulfenite’s yellow color.

More recent studies suggest that though the source of strong coloration is the presence of extrinsic impurities, the nonstoichiometry in both cationic and anionic sublattices also plays a major role in the coloration of the crystals. Tyagi et al. (2010) found that a reason for coloration in wulfenite is extrinsic impurity, as they were able to grow crystals displaying red, green, and various shades of yellow simply through changing the purity of the starting charges. They also posited that the presence of Pb3+ is not the cause of coloration. Because the crystals they grew in an Ar ambient are light yellow in color, they suggest that the interstitial oxygen concentration may be another cause in the coloration of wulfenite. Tyagi et al. note, however, the Mo is in a lower valence state when in Ar ambient, meaning it is Mo5+ rather than Mo6+. This suggests that the concentration of Mo5+ sites is also a cause of the coloration.

Talla et al. (2013) posits that trace amounts of chromium do in fact play a role in determining the coloration of wulfenite. Here, the CrO42- anion group substitutes for the MoO42- group in the tetrahedral position. They found that as little as 0.002 atoms per formula unit of Cr6+ substituting for Mo6+ is adequate to result in an orange-hued specimen. Cr6+  values of 0.01 were able to result in a red color. Talla et al. went on to emphasize that the colors result from a change of absorption intensity rather than a change of spectral position.

Gallery

See also

List of minerals named after people
Tungsten
Stolzite
Scheelite

References

Lead minerals
Molybdenum minerals
Tetragonal minerals
Minerals in space group 88
Symbols of Arizona